The Cardinal School is a high school in Meycauayan, Bulacan, Philippines, founded by Engr. Jesus Aguilos and Director Aida Aguilos. It was established in 1985.

High schools in Bulacan
Educational institutions established in 1985
Education in Meycauayan
1985 establishments in the Philippines